The 11th Seiyu Awards was held on March 18, 2017 at the JOQR Media Plus Hall in Minato, Tokyo. The winners of the Merit Awards, the Kei Tomiyama Award and the Kazue Takahashi Award were announced on February 21, 2017. The winners of the Synergy Award and Kids/Family award was announced on March 14, 2017. The rest of the winners were announced on the ceremony day.

References

Seiyu
Seiyu
2017 in Japanese cinema
2017 in Japanese television
March 2017 events in Japan
Seiyu Awards ceremonies